Anostirus purpureus is a species of beetle belonging to the family Elateridae.

It is native to Central and Southern Europe.

References

Elateridae